Pa Nai is a tambon (subdistrict) of Phrao District, in Chiang Mai Province, Thailand. In 2017 it had a population of 4,509 people.

Administration

Central administration
The tambon is divided into 10 administrative villages (muban).

Local administration
The area of the subdistrict is covered by the subdistrict municipality (thesaban tambon) Pa Nai (เทศบาลตำบลป่าไหน่).

References

External links
Thaitambon.com on Pa Nai

Tambon of Chiang Mai province
Populated places in Chiang Mai province